Hynobius yiwuensis, the Yiwu salamander, is a species of salamander in the family Hynobiidae, endemic to Zhejiang, China. Its distribution area is central and eastern Zhejiang, and includes Yiwu that has given it its name. Its natural habitats are subtropical moist lowland forests, rivers, freshwater marshes, intermittent freshwater marshes, arable land, and rural gardens. The Yiwu salamander is threatened by habitat loss.

The Yiwu salamander is similar to Chinese salamander (H. chinensis) and somewhat larger Amji's salamander (or Zhejiang salamander, H. amjiensis).

References

yiwuensis
Endemic fauna of Zhejiang
Amphibians of China
Taxonomy articles created by Polbot
Amphibians described in 1985